Girolamo Simoncelli (Senigallia, 16 February 1817 – Senigallia, 2 October 1852 ) was an Italian political and military leader of the Risorgimento era.

Bibliography 

  A. Bonopera, Sinigaglia nel 1848-49 e il processo di Girolamo Simoncelli, Jesi, La Tipografica Jesina, 1912
  G. Monti Guarnieri, Annali di Senigallia, Ancona, Tip. S.I.T.A., 1961
  A. Mencucci, Pio IX e il Risorgimento, Senigallia, Tip. Adriatica, 1964
  E. Grossi, Cattolici nel Senigalliese (1897-1920), Senigallia, Edizioni 2G, 1978
  M. Bonvini Mazzanti, Senigallia, Senigallia, Edizioni 2G, 1981
  R. P. Uguccioni, L’anno del proverbio. Il 1848 nello Stato pontificio e nella legazione apostolica di Urbino e Pesaro, Pesaro, Flaminia, 1987
  A. Polverari, Senigallia nella Storia, 4 Evo Contemporaneo Parte Prima, Ostra Vetere, Tecnostampa, 1991
  M. Severini, Girolamo Simoncelli. La storia e la memoria, Ancona, Risorgimento-affinità elettive, 2008.

1817 births
1852 deaths
Italian people of the Italian unification